The 2011–12 Iona Gaels men's basketball team represented Iona College during the 2011–12 NCAA Division I men's basketball season. The Gaels, led by second year head coach Tim Cluess, played their home games at the Hynes Athletic Center and are members of the Metro Atlantic Athletic Conference. The Gaals were MAAC regular season champions but failed to win the MAAC Basketball tournament after losing to Fairfield in the semifinals. They received an at–large bid to the 2012 NCAA tournament where they lost to BYU in the First Four round. The Gaels led BYU by 25 points in the 1st half. It was the largest comeback in NCAA Tournament history.

Roster

Schedule

|-
!colspan=9| Regular season

|-
!colspan=9| 2012 MAAC men's basketball tournament

|-
!colspan=9| 2012 NCAA tournament

Rankings

References

Iona Gaels men's basketball seasons
Iona
Iona